Saint Vincent de Paul Chapel is a Roman Catholic chapel in Paris, 6th arrondissement, 95 rue de Sèvres. It is dedicated to saint Vincent de Paul (1581–1660) where his remains are venerated in a silver reliquary (made by Charles Odiot) above the main altar.

History 
This chapel is the church of the Vincentians, founded by saint Vincent de Paul in 1625 and relocated here in 1817  rue de Sèvres, after being expelled from their mother house of Saint-Lazare by the Revolution.

To honour their founder, the Vincentians built this chapel in order to shelter his relics. The first stone was laid on 17 August 1826. The chapel was consecrated on 1 November 1827 by Archbishop de Quélen.
It was restored in 1983 and 1992. It is registered into Monuments historiques on 27 March 1994.

The tomb of Saint Jean-Gabriel Perboyre is to be found as well in the chapel.

Notes

External links 
 Paris Catholique
  Guide of the chapel

Vincent de Paul
Congregation of the Mission
19th-century Roman Catholic church buildings in France